Three Sisters is a play by the Russian author and playwright Anton Chekhov. It was written in 1900 and first performed in 1901 at the Moscow Art Theatre. The play is sometimes included on the short list of Chekhov's outstanding plays, along with The Cherry Orchard, The Seagull and Uncle Vanya.

Characters

The Prozorovs
 Olga Sergeyevna Prozorova (Olga) – The eldest of the three sisters, she is the matriarchal figure of the Prozorov family, though at the beginning of the play she is only 28 years old. Olga is a teacher at the high school, where she frequently fills in for the headmistress whenever the latter is absent. Olga is a spinster and at one point tells Irina that she would have married "any man, even an old man if he had asked" her. Olga is very motherly even to the elderly servants, keeping on the elderly nurse/retainer Anfisa, long after she has ceased to be useful. When Olga reluctantly takes the role of headmistress permanently, she takes Anfisa with her to escape the clutches of the heartless Natasha.
 Maria Sergeyevna Kulygina (Masha) – The middle sister, she is 23 at the beginning of the play. She married her husband, Kulygin, when she was 18 and just out of school. When the play opens she has been disappointed in the marriage and falls completely in love with the idealistic Lieutenant-Colonel Vershinin. They begin a clandestine affair. When he is transferred away, she is crushed, but returns to life with her husband, who accepts her back despite knowing what she has done. She has a short temper, which is seen frequently throughout the play, and is the sister who disapproves the most of Natasha. Onstage, her directness often serves as a tonic to the melodrama, and her ironic wit comes across as heroic. She provides much of the humour. She was trained as a concert pianist.
 Irina Sergeyevna Prozorova – The youngest sister, she is 20 at the beginning of the play.  It is her "name day" at the beginning of the play and though she insists she is grown-up she is still enchanted by things such as a spinning top brought to her by Fedotik. Her only desire is to go back to Moscow, which they left eleven years before the play begins. She believes she will find her true love in Moscow, but when it becomes clear that they are not going to Moscow, she agrees to marry the Baron Tuzenbach, whom she admires but does not love. She gets her teaching degree and plans to leave with the Baron, but he is shot and killed by the psychopath Solyony in a pointless duel. She decides to leave anyway and dedicate her life to work and service.
 Andrei Sergeyevich Prozorov (Andrey) – The brother of the three sisters. In Act I, he is a young man on the fast track to becoming a faculty professor in Moscow. However, his inertia, weak-willed indecisiveness, and poor judgment (all of which will become apparent throughout the play) put paid to those dreams. In Act II, he still longs for his old days as a bachelor dreaming of life in Moscow, but is now, due to his fatefully ill-conceived wedding to Natasha, stuck in a provincial town with a baby and a job as secretary to the County Council. In Act III, his debts have grown to 35,000 rubles and he is forced to mortgage the house, but does not tell his sisters or give them any shares in the family home. Act IV finds Andrei a pathetic shell of his former self, now the father of two (although he may not be the biological father of the younger child). He acknowledges he is a failure and laughed at in town for being a member of the village council whose president, Protopopov (never seen onstage), is cuckolding him.
 Natalia Ivanovna Prozorov (Natasha) – Andrei's love interest, later his wife. She begins the play as an awkward young woman who dresses poorly and is ridiculed and teased by Andrei's sisters. Much fun is made of her ill-becoming green sash and she bursts into tears. She apparently has no family of her own, although not known to be an orphan (a signal that she cares for no one but herself) and the reader never learns her maiden name. She agrees to marry Andrei despite seemingly being surprised by the proposal. Act II finds a very different Natasha. In Act III, she has become even more controlling. She is determined, among other things, to expel the sisters' now elderly former family retainer, Anfisa, who is no longer fit for hard work, and still throws temper tantrums whenever she doesn't get her way, an increasingly rare event. Act IV finds that she has control of the house, and, as the châtelaine, is planning to radically change the grounds to her liking. Inarguably, she is the victor by the end of the play — caring for no one besides her own children, Bobik and Sofia, upon whom she dotes. The only woman in the play with children, she rules the Prozorov's now mortgaged (to pay for her husband's debts and her expensive tastes) former family home with an iron fist. She orders the trees on the property be cut down because they are ugly at night.
 Fyodor Ilyich Kulygin – Masha's older husband and the Latin teacher at the high school. Kulygin is a jovial, kindly man, who truly loves his wife, and her sisters, although he is very much aware of her infidelity. In the first act he seems almost foolish, giving Irina a gift he has already given her, and joking around with the doctor to make fun of Natasha, but begins to grow more and more sympathetic as Masha's affair progresses. During the fire in Act 3, he confesses to Olga that he might have married her – the fact that the two would probably be very happy together is hinted at many times during the play. Throughout the play, often at the most serious moments, he often tries to make the other characters laugh in order to relieve tension, and while that doesn't always work, he is able to give his wife comfort through humour in her darkest hour at the climax of the play. At the end of the play, although knowing what Masha has done, he takes her back and accepts her failings.

The soldiers

  Aleksandr Ignatyevich Vershinin – Lieutenant colonel commanding the artillery battery, Vershinin is a true philosopher. He knew the girls' father in Moscow and they talk about how when they were little they called him the "Lovesick Major". In the course of the play, despite being married, he enters into an affair with Masha but must end it when the battery is transferred. He frequently mentions how his wife regularly attempts suicide (and he has two daughters), but he seems to not care. His first act speech about the hope he has for civilization speaks directly to Masha's melancholic heart, and, upon hearing it, she declares "I'm staying for lunch."
 Baron Nikolaj Lvovich Tuzenbach – A lieutenant in the army and not deemed handsome, Tuzenbach often tries to impress Irina, whom he has loved for five years. He quits the Army to go to work in an attempt to impress her. He is repeatedly taunted by Solyony and between Acts III and IV, he retaliates and prompts Solyony to declare a duel. He is killed in the duel, thus his and Irina's union is forlorn.
 Staff Captain Vassily Vasilyevich Solyony – A captain in the army, Solyony is a borderline psychotic social misfit and a rather modern type of antihero. Infatuated with Irina, he tries to put down the Baron to make himself look better, but Irina finds him crude and unappealing. He spends much of his time mocking the Baron, who is the closest thing he has to a friend, and ends up killing him in a pointless duel because he has sworn to kill any successful suitor for Irina even though he knows it will not win him her hand. (He has fought at least two previous duels, although the details and fates of his previous dueling opponents is not specified.) He claims to have a remarkable resemblance to the poet Lermontov in both face and personality, often quoting him, although Lermontov was killed in a duel by refusing to fire at his opponent, Nikolai Martynov, who aimed at Lermontov's heart. Thus, Solyony turns out to be the polar opposite of Lermontov in actual character and closer to Martynov. He always carries a small perfume bottle which he frequently (almost pathologically) sprinkles his hands and body with; it is later revealed that he does it to mask the smell of corpses on him.
 Ivan Romanovich Chebutykin – Sixty years old and an army doctor, Chebutykin starts off as a fun, eccentric old man who exults in his place as family friend and lavishes upon Irina the expensive but inappropriate gift of a samovar. Later on in Act III, while drunk, he suffers an existential crisis and reveals to all about Natasha's and Protopopov's affair. In Act IV however, he seems to have come to terms with his crisis or perhaps been broken by it. He was in love, apparently unrequitedly, with the  Prozorov siblings' mother, a married woman.
 Alexei Petrovich Fedotik – A sub-lieutenant, Fedotik hangs around the house buying many gifts for the family. He also is an amateur photographer, and takes photos of the group. In Act III, he loses all his belongings in the fire, but retains his cheerful nature.
 Vladimir Karlovich Rode – Another sub-lieutenant, Rode is a drill coach at the high school.

Others
 Ferapont – Door-keeper at the local council offices, Ferapont is an old man with a partial hearing loss. He repeatedly blurts out random facts, usually relating to Moscow.
 Anfisa – An elderly family retainer and former nurse, Anfisa is 81 years old and has worked forever for the Prozorov family. Natasha begins to despise her for her feebleness and threatens to throw her out but Olga rescues her, taking her to live at Olga's teacher's flat.

Unseen characters
The play has several important characters who are talked about frequently, but never seen onstage. These include Protopopov, head of the local Council and Natasha's lover; Vershinin's suicidal wife and two daughters; Kulygin's beloved superior the headmaster of the high school, and Natasha's children (Bobik and Sofia). JL Styan contends in his The Elements of Drama that in the last act Chekhov revised the text to show that Protopopov is the real father of Sofia: "The children are to be tended by their respective fathers" — Andrey pushes Bobik in his pram, and Protopopov sits with Sofia.

Synopsis

Act I
Act one begins with Olga (the eldest sister) working as a schoolteacher but at the end of the play she is made headmistress, a position she had said she did not want. Masha, the middle sister and the artist of the family (she was trained as a concert pianist), is married to Feodor Ilyich Kulygin, a schoolteacher. At the time of their marriage, Masha, younger than he, was enchanted by what she took to be wisdom, but seven years later, she sees through his pedantry and his clownish attempts to compensate for the emptiness between them. Irina, the youngest sister, is still full of expectation. She speaks of her dream of going to Moscow and meeting her true love. It was in Moscow that the sisters grew up, and they all long to return to the sophistication and happiness of that time.  Andrei is the only boy in the family and his sisters adore him. He falls in love with Natalia Ivanovna ("Natasha"), who is somewhat common in relation to the sisters and initially suffers under their glance. The play begins on the first anniversary of the death of their father, Sergei Prozorov. It is also Irina's name-day, and everyone, including the soldiers (led by the gallant Vershinin) bringing with them a sense of noble idealism, comes together to celebrate it. At the very close of the act, Andrei exultantly confesses his feelings to Natasha in private and fatefully asks her to marry him.

Act II
Act two begins almost a year later with Andrei and Natasha married with their first child (offstage), a baby boy named Bobik. Natasha is having an affair with Protopopov, Andrei's superior, a character who is mentioned but never seen onstage. Masha comes home flushed from a night out, and it is clear that she and her companion, Lieutenant-Colonel Vershinin, are giddy with the secret of their mutual love for one another. Natasha manipulatively quashes the plans for a party in the home; the resultant quiet suggests that all happiness is being quashed as well. Tuzenbach and Solyony both declare their love for Irina.

Act III 
Act three takes place about a year later in Olga and Irina's room, a clear sign that Natasha is taking over the household as she asked them to share rooms so that her child could have a different room.  There has been a fire in the town, and, in the crisis, people are passing in and out of the room, carrying blankets and clothes to give aid.  Olga, Masha and Irina are angry with their brother, Andrei, for mortgaging their home without their knowledge or consent, keeping the money to pay off his gambling debts and ceding all power over the household to his wife. However, when faced with Natasha's cruelty to their aged family retainer, Anfisa, Olga's own best efforts to stand up to Natasha come to naught. Masha, alone with her sisters, confides in them her romance with Vershinin ("I love, love, love that man."). At one point, Kulygin (Masha's husband) blunders into the room, doting ever more foolishly on her, and she stalks out. Irina despairs at the common turn her life has taken, the life of a municipal worker, even as she rails at the folly of her aspirations and her education. ("I can't remember the Italian for 'window'".) Out of her resignation, supported in this by Olga's realistic outlook, Irina decides to accept Tuzenbach's offer of marriage even though she does not love him. Chebutykin drunkenly stumbles and smashes a clock which had belonged to the Prozorov siblings' late mother, whom he loved. Andrei then vents his self-hatred, acknowledges his own awareness of life's folly and his disappointment in Natasha, and begs his sisters' forgiveness for everything.

Act IV 
In the fourth and final act, outdoors behind the home, the soldiers are preparing to leave the area. A flash-photograph is taken. There is an undercurrent of tension because Solyony has challenged the Baron (Tuzenbach) to a duel over a flimsy pretext. Solyony had told Irina that he would kill any successful suitor for her hand but she still agreed to marry Tuzenbach, notwithstanding which she confesses that she cannot love him, likening her heart to a piano whose key has been lost. (Tuzenbach, having left the Army was under no obligation to agree to the duel but did so, anyway, losing his life for what would have been a loveless marriage.) As the soldiers are leaving, a shot is heard, and Tuzenbach's death in the duel is announced shortly before the end of the play.

Masha has to be pulled, sobbing, from Vershinin's arms, but her husband willingly, compassionately, asks that they start again. Olga has reluctantly accepted the position of permanent headmistress of the school where she teaches and is moving out. She is taking Anfisa with her, thus rescuing the elderly woman from Natasha.

Irina's fate is uncertain but, even in her grief at Tuzenbach's death, she wants to persevere in her work as a teacher. Natasha remains as the chatelaine, in charge and in control of everything. Andrei is stuck in his marriage with two children, unwilling and unable to do anything for his wife or himself. As the play closes, the three sisters stand in a desperate embrace, gazing off as the soldiers depart to the sound of a band's gay march. As Chebutykin sings Ta-ra-ra-boom-di-ay to himself, Olga's final lines call for an end to the confusion all three feel at life's sufferings and joy: "If we only knew... If we only knew."

Premiere
The play was written for the Moscow Art Theatre and it opened on 31 January 1901, under the direction of Konstantin Stanislavski and Vladimir Nemirovich-Danchenko. Stanislavski played Vershinin and the sisters were Olga Knipper (for whom Chekhov wrote the part of Masha), Margarita Savitskaya as Olga and Maria Andreyeva as Irina. Maria Lilina (Stanislavski's wife) was Natasha, Vsevolod Meyerhold appeared as Tusenbach, Mikhail Gromov as Solyony, Alexander Artyom as Artem Chebutykin, Ioasaf Tikhomirov as Fedotik, Ivan Moskvin as Rode, Vladimir Gribunin as Ferapont, and Maria Samarova as Anfisa.

Reception was mixed. Chekhov felt that Stanislavski's "exuberant" direction had masked the subtleties of the work and that only Knipper had shown her character developing in the manner the playwright had intended. In the directors' view, the point was to show the hopes, aspirations and dreams of the characters, but audiences were affected by the pathos of the sisters' loneliness and desperation and by their eventual, uncomplaining acceptance of their situation. Nonetheless the piece proved popular and soon it became established in the company's repertoire.

Notable productions

 John Gielgud's 1936–37 landmark season at the Queen's Theatre included a well-received production with Peggy Ashcroft as Irina and Michael Redgrave as Tusenbach.
 In 1942, Judith Anderson portrayed Olga, Katharine Cornell portrayed Masha, Gertrude Musgrove portrayed Irina, and Ruth Gordon portrayed Natasha on Broadway. The production was significant enough to land the cast on the cover of Time on 21 December 1942, which proclaimed it "a dream production by anybody's reckoning – the most glittering cast the theatre has seen, commercially, in this generation".
 The 1963 inaugural season of the Guthrie Theater included a production with Jessica Tandy as Olga. 
 There is a filmed record of a mid-1960s production by The Actors Studio with Kim Stanley and Geraldine Page as Masha and Olga, respectively, supported by Sandy Dennis's Irina and Shelley Winters as Natasha.
 American Film Theatre in 1970 filmed a version with a witty Masha from Joan Plowright opposite Alan Bates as Vershinin, with Ronald Pickup as Tusenbach and Laurence Olivier, who co-directed, playing Chebutykin. The film was based on a theatre production that Olivier directed at the Royal National Theatre in 1967.
 Rosemary Harris, Ellen Burstyn and Tovah Feldshuh played, respectively, Olga, Masha and Irina at the Brooklyn Academy of Music in the 1970s with René Auberjonois as Solyony.
 A 1982 production at Manhattan Theatre Club, had Dianne Wiest as Masha, Lisa Banes as Olga, Mia Dillon as Irina, Christine Ebersole as Natasha, Sam Waterston as Vershinin, Jeff Daniels as Andrei, Bob Balaban as Tusenbach, and Jack Gilford as Chebutykin.
 Chicago's Steppenwolf Theatre Company put one together under the direction of Austin Pendleton, with Molly Regan as Olga, Joan Allen as Masha, Rondi Reed as Natasha, and Kevin Anderson as Solyony.
 In 1985 Casper Wrede directed a production at the Royal Exchange, Manchester with Cheryl Prime as Natasha, Emma Piper as Olga, Janet McTeer as Masha, Niamh Cusack as Irina and Espen Skjonberg as Dr Chebutykin.
 The Roundabout Theatre in New York had Jerry Stiller as Chebutykin, Billy Crudup as Solyony, Eric Stoltz as Tuzenbach, Lili Taylor as Irina, Paul Giamatti as Andrei, Amy Irving as Olga, Jeanne Tripplehorn as Masha, Calista Flockhart as Natasha, and David Strathairn as Vershinin.
 In 1990, the Irish theatrical dynasty, the Cusacks, were cast in the play, in a new version by Frank McGuinness, which opened at the Gate Theatre in Dublin with the three award-winning sisters Sinéad Cusack (Masha), Sorcha Cusack (Olga) and Niamh Cusack (Irina) in the title rôles and their father Cyril Cusack as Dr. Chebutykin. This is the only production ever to cast three 'real' sisters, professional actors in their own rights, in the title rôles.  The production, which was directed by the then newly appointed Artistic Director of the Royal Shakespeare Company, Adrian Noble, transferred to London's Royal Court Theatre for a sell-out season in 1991.  Amongst the supporting cast were Lesley Manville as Natasha and Finbar Lynch as Tusenbach.
 In 1991, sisters Vanessa Redgrave (Olga) and Lynn Redgrave (Masha) made their first and only appearance together onstage in this, with niece Jemma Redgrave as Irina at the Queen's Theatre, London.
 In 2003, Romanian director Radu Afrim adapted the play in a controversial production at the Andrei Mureşanu theatre in Sfantu-Gheorghe, highly criticized by Michael Billington, but praised by other critics, leading to a local controversy in the Romanian press which would catapult Afrim to national superstardom in Romanian theatre.
 The play was produced in 2010 at the Lyric Hammersmith by Filter with a cast including Poppy Miller, Romola Garai and Clare Dunne.
 In 2010, the play was adapted by for Theatre Na Fidlovačce, Prague as Tři sestry. The sisters played Andrea Černá, Zuzana Vejvodová and Martina Randová and other actors were Otakar Brousek ml. as Vershinin, Tomáš Töpfer as Doctor Chebutykin
 In 2012, the play was staged at the Young Vic, directed by Benedict Andrews in his own new version. The cast included Vanessa Kirby, Mariah Gale and Sam Troughton.
 In 2014, the play was staged at the Southwark Playhouse, directed by Russell Bolam. The cast included Olivia Hallinan, Holliday Grainger and Paul McGann.
 In 2017, the play was staged at the Studio Theatre directed by Jackson Gay in conjunction with a modern adaption called No Sisters;; directed by Aaron Posner.
 In 2017, the play was staged by Sydney Theatre Company at the Drama Theatre, Sydney Opera House from 6 November — 16 December. The new adaptation was by Andrew Upton and the cast included Alison Bell as Olga, Miranda Daughtry as Irina and Harry Greenwood as Tusenbach.
In 2019, the play was staged at the Almeida Theatre in London, with Alan Williams playing Ivan Romanovich Chebutykin.

Adaptations
 Three Sisters has been adapted into a full-length opera by Hungarian composer Péter Eötvös and Claus H. Henneberg, as Tri sestry (Three Sisters). It was premiered at the Opéra National de Lyon in 1998, directed by Ushio Amagatsu, and conducted by Kent Nagano and the composer.
 Three Sisters on Hope Street,  a 2008 British play co-written by Diane Samuels and Tracy Ann Oberman, reinterprets Chekhov's play by transferring events to Liverpool after World War II and re-casting the Pozorov sisters as three Jewish Englishwomen. It opened at the Everyman Theatre, Liverpool on 25 January 2008 before beginning a second run at the Hampstead Theatre in London.
 In 2011, the play was adapted by Blake Morrison for Northern Broadsides as We Are Three Sisters, drawing out parallels with the lives of the Brontë sisters.
 In 2020 an adaptation of the play by Inua Ellams, set in Owerri, Nigeria during the Nigerian Civil War between 1967 and 1970, was staged at the Lyttelton Theatre in London.
 Track 3, a 2013 adaptation of the play created by Theatre Movement Bazaar co-founders, Tina Kronis and Richard Alger.  It premiered in Los Angeles and has played in the UK, China, and in 2017 was the first US production in over 25 years to play in the Chekhov International Theatre Festival in Moscow.
 Moscow Moscow Moscow Moscow Moscow Moscow, a stage adaptation by Halley Feiffer that approaches the story through a contemporary lens, originally premiering in 2017.

Notes

References

External links

 
 
 Oxquarry Books, an English translation of Three Sisters Project Gutenberg, English translations of several Chekhov plays, including Three Sisters''
 Full text of Three Sisters 
 
 Three Sisters from Czech theatre 'Divadlo na Fidlovačce', Prague

1901 plays
Three Sisters, The
Plays set in Russia